James Grimes may refer to:

James W. Grimes (1816–1872), American statesman
James Grimes (soccer) (born 1968), Canadian striker
James Walter Grimes (born 1953), American botanist
James Grimes, involved in the St Kilda Road robberies

See also
 James Grime, contributor to Numberphile, a mathematics YouTube channel